Jack McVitie (19 April 1932 – 29 October 1967), best known as Jack the Hat, was an English criminal from London during the 1950s and 1960s. He is posthumously famous for triggering the imprisonment and downfall of the Kray twins. He had acted as an enforcer and hitman with links to The Firm, and was murdered by Reggie Kray in 1967.

Criminal history 
McVitie's first criminal conviction was in October 1946 when he was taken to Buntingford Juvenile Court for stealing a watch and cigarettes.

Life 
McVitie married Marie Marney in Surrey in 1950. He fathered one son who was named Tony McVitie. The nickname Jack the Hat is said to be because of a trilby hat that he wore to cover up his hair loss. A known drug trafficker by the 1960s, he had been an associate of the Kray twins for some time and, although never a permanent member of The Firm, was regularly employed to commit various crimes on their behalf.

In 1967, Ronnie Kray paid McVitie £500 in advance to kill ex-friend and business partner Leslie Payne, promising he would give another £500 when the job was finished, amid fears that Payne was about to inform the police of his criminal activities. McVitie and a friend, Billy Exley, set off to shoot Payne, but were unsuccessful. Exley, the driver, suffered from heart trouble and McVitie was now heavily dependent on drugs.

Arriving at Payne's home, McVitie hammered loudly on the front door, which luckily for Payne was opened by his wife. "He's not in," she said. "That's all right," said McVitie and he and Exley left. Instead of repaying the money McVitie kept it. This incident led, in part, to McVitie's death.

Death 
On 29 October 1967, McVitie was invited to a party in Evering Road in Stoke Newington, London, with several of his underworld associates and their families. The Krays had secretly arrived at the party first and had spent an hour clearing away guests. Reggie Kray's initial plan to shoot McVitie upon entry failed. His gun jammed and, instead, he stabbed McVitie repeatedly in the face, chest and stomach as part of a brief but violent struggle. The twins quickly fled the scene and McVitie's body was deposited, wrapped in an eiderdown and left outside St Mary's Church, Rotherhithe by Tony and Chris Lambrianou, Keith Askem and Ronnie Bender, who were minor members of the Firm.

When the Krays discovered the whereabouts of the corpse, they ordered it to be immediately moved, probably because of the close proximity of friend and associate Freddie Foreman. The body was never recovered, although in an interview in 2000 (which featured Reg Kray giving a frank account of the activity of the Firm 12 days before his death) Foreman admitted to throwing McVitie's body from a boat into the sea at Newhaven, Sussex.

Justice 
Following McVitie's murder, the Krays and several other members of their gang were finally arrested by the Scotland Yard police officers who had been watching their exploits for years. At the Old Bailey on 4 March 1969, both were found guilty of murder and sentenced to life imprisonment with a recommendation that they should each serve a minimum of 30 years. Ronnie's murder conviction was for the murder of rival gangster, George Cornell, whom he shot dead in March 1966.

The jury took 6 hours and 55 minutes to reach their unanimous verdict. Never before at the Old Bailey had such a long and expensive trial taken place. The Krays' elder brother Charlie, together with Freddie Foreman (who helped move the body) and Cornelius Whitehead, were all found guilty of being accessories to McVitie's murder.

Prison seemed to do much to encourage the myth and legend surrounding the Krays. Both wrote best-selling books about their lives and, in 1990, a full-length biographical film entitled The Krays was released (featuring real-life brothers Martin and Gary Kemp as the Kray twins). Jack McVitie was portrayed by actor Tom Bell in this film before also featuring in the 2004 film Charlie, this time depicted by Marius Swift. In the 2015 film about the Krays, Legend, he is played by Sam Spruell.

See also
List of solved missing person cases

References

Sources 
DeVito, Carlo. The Encyclopedia of International Organized Crime. New York: Facts on File Inc., 2005;

External links 

1932 births
1960s missing person cases
1960s murders in London
1967 deaths
1967 in London
1967 murders in the United Kingdom
Criminals from London
English gangsters
English murder victims
Formerly missing people
Kray twins
Male murder victims
Missing person cases in England
Murder convictions without a body
Murdered British gangsters
Murder in London
People murdered by British organized crime
People murdered in London